Deh Darvishan (also Romanized as Deh Darvīshān and Deh Dorvīshan; also known as Deh Darvish-e ‘Azizābād and Deh-e Darvish (Persian: ده درویش), also Romanized as Deh-e Darvīsh) is a village in Pachehlak-e Gharbi Rural District, in the Central District of Azna County, Lorestan Province, Iran. At the 2006 census, its population was 129, in 21 families.

References 

Towns and villages in Azna County